Lost Children is a 1956 Czechoslovak historical drama anti-war film directed by Miloš Makovec and based on Jiří Brdečka's adaptation of a short story by Alois Jirásek. The film was screened in the main competition section of the 1957 Cannes Film Festival.

Plot
During a war between Austria and Prussia, three soldiers desert their units after being defeated by the Prussian army and find the shelter in a lonely farmhouse. They do not share the pacifist belief of the farmer, but they also do not want to fight anymore. After the farm house is attacked by plundering Prussian hussars, the three soldiers decide to fight and eventually die, not for glory or money or their empress, but for innocent people.

Cast
 Stanislav Fišer as The infantryman
 Vladimír Hlavatý as The hussar
 Gustáv Valach as The cuirassier
 Ladislav Gzela as Zieten Hussar #1
 Vladimír Klemens as Zieten Hussar #2
 Radovan Lukavský as Jíra (farmer)
 Alena Vránová as Baruška

References

External links
 

1956 films
1950s historical films
Czechoslovak drama films
Czech historical drama films
1950s Czech-language films
1956 war films
Anti-war films
Czech war films
Films based on short fiction
Films based on works by Alois Jirásek
Films set in the 18th century
1950s political films
Films with screenplays by Jiří Brdečka
1950s Czech films
Czechoslovak black-and-white films
Czechoslovak war films